The Dark Wheel is a crime novel by Philip MacDonald and A. Boyd Correll.

Plot introduction
The novel centers on Cornelius Van Toller, a wealthy New Yorker, with Jekyll-and-Hyde character. His obsession with actress Kay Forrester sets the stage for a thrilling drama.

Publication history
1948, USA, New York, Morrow,  OCLC: 3703774, Hardback
1948, UK, London, Collins Crime Club, OCLC: 31027640, Hardback
1959, USA, New York, Zenith Books, OCLC: 7396423, Paperback, as Sweet and Deadly

1947 American novels
American crime novels